This is a list of programming which has aired on the TV channel Nick Jr. in the United Kingdom and Ireland (including Nick Jr. Too).

Current programming

Original programming 
 Anna & Friends (2022-present)
 The Adventures of Paddington (17 February 2020 – present)
 Ben & Holly's Little Kingdom (6 April 2009–present)
 Deer Squad (25 January 2021 – present)
 Dora the Explorer (2002-present)
 Max and Ruby (31 March 2003 - 19 May 2021)
 Peppa Pig (31 May 2004 – present)

Acquired from Nick Jr. USA 

 Baby Shark's Big Show! (8 May 2021 – present)
 Blaze and the Monster Machines (2014-present)
 Blue's Clues & You! (2020-present)
 Bubble Guppies (2011-present)
 PAW Patrol (4 November 2013 – present)
 Ryan's Mystery Playdate (7 September 2019 – present)
 Santiago of the Seas (2 November 2020 – present)
 The Tiny Chef Show (9 January 2023 - present)

Other acquired programming 
 Barbapapa: One Big Happy Family! (10 July 2021 – present)
 Kangaroo Beach (26 July 2021 – present)
 Pip & Posy (2022-present)
 Ricky Zoom (27 September 2019 – present)
 Thomas & Friends: All Engines Go (2022-present)

Former programming 
 44 Cats (5 March 2019 - 6 February 2020)
 Abby Hatcher (6 May 2019 – 3 November 2022)
 The Adventures of Portland Bill (1999 – 2 September 2009)
 ALVINNN!!! and the Chipmunks (10 April 2015 - 20 January 2020)
 Angelina Ballerina (6 October 2003 – 29 November 2009)
 Angelina Ballerina: The Next Steps (30 November 2009 - 18 November 2015)
 Animal Alphabet (1999 - 5 February 2009) (continued into 2011 as intervals) 
 Amazing Animals (1999 - 2 January 2009) (continued into 2006 as intervals)
 Animal Antics (1999 - 30 September 2009)
 Astro Farm (1999 - 5 October 2009)
 Babar (1998 - 1 July 2009)
 Baby Animals (1999 - 3 February 2009)
 The Backyardigans (5 September 2005 - 16 December 2014)
 Bagpuss (1998 - 4 January 2009)
 Bananas in Pyjamas (original series) (1999 - 31 August 2009)
 Becca's Bunch (2 July 2018 - 25 December 2019)
 Big Block SingSong (January 7, 2013 - July 22, 2018, Moved to Sky Kids in 2023)
 Billy (2000 - 3 February 2009)
 Blue's Clues (original series) (5 January 1999 - 10 November 2014)
 Bob the Builder (original series, including Project Build It) (1999 - 6 February 2012)
 Bod (1999 - 24 January 2009)
 Boohbah (2nd April 2005 - 31st October 2009)
 The Bopps (4 April 2010 - 11 November 2016)
 Bruno (2004-2011) (aired during advert breaks.)
 Brave Bunnies (2021-2022)
 Budgie the Little Helicopter (1999 – 1st September 2009)
 Bump (2nd August 2004 - 2nd October 2009)
 The Busy World of Richard Scarry (1998 - 1st July 2009)
 Butterbean's Café (4 February 2019 – 2 July 2021)
 Button Moon (1st May 2005 – 30th March 2009)
 Bubble and Squeak (5 February 2008 - 6 January 2014)
 Bubble Guppies (2011-present)
 Camberwick Green (31 March 2008 - 5 October 2009)
 Chigley (28 May 2007 - 4 January 2009)
 Christopher Crocodile (2000 - 3 February 2009)
 Clangers (Original series 1-2 only) (2000 – 4 January 2009)
 Corn & Peg (10 August 2019 - 2 November 2020)
 Crystal Tipps and Alistair (4 April 2005 - 2 September 2009)
 Cubeez (1 October 2001 – 5 October 2009)
 The Day Henry Met... (4 January 2016 – 19 May 2021)
 Digby Dragon (4 July 2016 - 18 May 2021)
 Dinosaur Train (20 February 2012 – 2 April 2015)
 Dora and Friends: Into the City! (3 November 2014- 1 September 2019)
 Dream Street (6 December 2002 – 28 February 2009)
 The Early Worms (1999– 21 April 2015) (Including shows, segments, and blocks)
 Engie Benjy (1 September 2003 – 30 July 2009)
 Eureeka's Castle (1999-2009) 
 The Fairies (27 August 2008 - 6 January 2014)
 Feodor (2000 - 1 July 2009)
 Fifi and the Flowertots (30 May 2005 – 10 November 2015)
 The Flumps (1 July 2002 - 3 February 2009)
 Floogals (2021 – 2022)
 Fraggle Rock (1999-2009)
 Franklin (1999 – 24 August 2009) (also aired on Channel 5's Milkshake!) 
 The Fresh Beat Band (9 August 2010 - 3 December 2017)
 Fresh Beat Band of Spies (6 February 2016 - 1 July 2017)
 Frootie Tooties (2000-2009)
 The Gingerbread Man (2002 -3 February 2009)
 Go, Diego, Go! (5 June 2005 – 5 November 2018)
 Go!Go!Go! (6th May 2013–2nd August 2015, aired during advert breaks)
 Guess How Much I Love You (12 January 2013 - 4 January 2015)
 Gullah Gullah Island (1999 - 1 July 2009)
 Hattytown Tales (2000 - 3 February 2009)
 Henry's Cat (2001 – 3 February 2009)
 The Herbs (2000 – 4 March 2009)
 The Hoobs (4 February 2002 – 5 October 2009)
 Hooley Dooleys (2000-2009) 
 Huxley Pig (2000 - 3 February 2009)
 Humf (2 March 2009 - 5 August 2017)
 I Spy (6 October 2003 – 1 April 2009) (Continued on Nick Jr Too in 2006)
 Ivor the Engine (1999 - 4 January 2009)
 It's a Big Big World (2008-2013) (Only aired on Nick Jr Too)
 James the Cat (2000 – September 1 2009)
 Jimbo and the Jetset (3 July 2002 - 3 February 2009)
 Kid-E-Cats (5 June 2018 - 29 December 2019)
 King Rollo (2000 – 31 August 2009)
 Kipper (2 September 2002 – 4 September 2009) (also aired on Tiny Pop)
 Kitu and Woofl (1 January 2002 - 3 February 2009)
 Kiva Can Do (9 January 2018 – 19 May 2021)
 Knyacki (2000–2013) 
 Lalaloopsy (7 October 2013 - 2 November 2014)
 LazyTown (3 October 2005 – 31 October 2011) (season 1-2 only) (also aired on CBeebies) 
 Let's Go Pocoyo (1 October 2012 - 11 June 2016)
 Lily's Driftwood Bay (5 May 2014 - 27 May 2017) 
 Lisa (1999 - 3 February 2009)
 Lizzie's Library (2000 - 3 February 2009)
 Little Bear (1999 - 10 December 2009) (also aired on Tiny Pop)
 Little Bill (2000 – 24 November 2014)
 Little Charmers (22 June 2015 - 7 May 2022)
 Louie (6 August 2013 - 26 May 2015)
 Maggie and the Ferocious Beast (2001 – 26 August 2012)
 Magic Mountain (1 July 2001 – 3 February 2009)
 The Magic School Bus (1999 – 2009)
 The Magic Roundabout (2007 Revival series) (22 October 2008 – 10 November 2015)
 The Magic Adventures of Mumfie (2000 – 1 September 2009)
 Maisy (2 September 2002 - 31 January 2009) (Continued on Nick Jr Too in 2006-2009)
 Mini Movers (5 November 2008 - 4 July 2015)
 Mouse and Mole (6 January 2003 - 5 October 2009)
 Mr Benn (1999 - 5 May 2009)
 Mr. Men and Little Miss (1999 - 30 July 2009)
 Muppet Babies (1999 – 2009)
 Mutt & Stuff (11 January 2020 - 5 April 2020)
 Nella the Princess Knight (15 May 2017 - 19 May 2021)
 Nellie the Elephant (2000 - 2009)
 Ni Hao, Kai-Lan (7 September 2008 – 5 January 2015)
 Oakie Doke (1 March 2003 - 2 November 2009)
 Olivia (11 January 2010 - 31 August 2014)
 Olive the Ostrich (5 September 2011 - 28 October 2015)
 Pablo the Little Red Fox (2000 - 1 September 2009)
 Paddington Bear (1999 - 5 October 2009)
 Pajanimals (23 September 2013 - 5 April 2017)
 Papa Beaver's Storytime (1999–2009)
 Parsley the Lion (3 September 2005 – 30 March 2009)
 PB Bear and Friends (1999 - 1 September 2009)
 Pic Me (1 August 2005 – 23 August 2012)
 Pocoyo (10 September 2012 - 18 November 2015)
 Poppy Cat (2 May 2011 - 17 November 2015)
 Puffin Rock (18 May 2015 - 11 April 2017)
 Rainbow (6 March 2005 – 4 January 2011)
 Roary the Racing Car (2 June 2007 – 16 December 2011)
 Robocar Poli (4 March 2017 - 4 June 2018)
 Rubbadubbers (5 May 2004 – 4 January 2011)
 Rugrats (1999 - 5 January 2015)
 Rusty Rivets (6 March 2017 – 7 July 2022)
 Sali Mali (1 October 2002 - 3 March 2009)
 Sesame Street (2000 - 31 August 2009)
 Sheeep (2000-2009) 
 Shimmer and Shine (9 November 2015 - 31 December 2019)
 The Smurfs (1 November 2021 - 4 July 2022)
 Snailympics (2001 - 3 February 2009)
 Spider! (6 March 2005 - 2 November 2009)
 Sunny Day (2 March 2018 - 29 December 2019)
 Super Why! (2 June 2008 - 5 January 2015)
 Team Umizoomi (6 September 2010 - 19 May 2021)
 Thomas & Friends (1999 – 19 February 2015)
 Theodore Tugboat (1999-31 August 2009)
 Tickety Toc (23 April 2012 – 25 December 2014)
 Top Wing (7 May 2018 - 1 August 2018) 
 Toot & Puddle (6 July 2009 - 1 September 2012)
 The Treacle People (2001 - 2 September 2009)
 Trumpton (5 March 2005 - 4 January 2009)
 The Upside Down Show (10 April 2005 - 17 September 2010)
 Wake Up World (2008–2013)
 Wanda and the Alien (5 January 2015 - 31 October 2015)
 Wallykazam (6 October 2014 - 16 March 2018)
 WaterMill Farm (Aired During Ad Breaks) (5th September 2011–3rd May 2015)
 What's Your News? (12 January 2009 - 1 January 2014)
 The Wiggles (5 April 2004 - 8 August 2012)
 Wiggle And Learn (7 March 2009 – 19 September 2012)
 Wiggly Park (1999 - 3 February 2009)
 Wimzie's House (1999–2009)
 Wissper (8 August 2017 - 4 September 2017)
 Wobblyland (1 October 2008 - 1 April 2013)
 The Wombles (1999 - 4 January 2009)
 Wonder Pets! (6 November 2008 - 5 January 2015)
 Wow! Wow! Wubbzy! (5 May 2008 - 1 January 2013)
 The Wubbulous World of Dr. Seuss (1999–2009)
 You Do Too (4 February 2002 - 1 November 2011)
 Yo Gabba Gabba! (18 February 2008 - 6 January 2014)
 Zack & Quack (7 February 2014 - 30 January 2016)
 Zoofari (1 August 2018 – 2 September 2021)

See also
 List of programmes broadcast by Nickelodeon (British and Irish TV channel)
 List of programmes broadcast by Nicktoons (British and Irish TV channel)

References

Lists of television series by network
Nick Jr.